Lutter is a small river that flows near Bad Lauterberg in the district of Göttingen in the north German state of Lower Saxony.

The Lutter begins at the confluence of the Grade Lutter and Krumme Lutter in Kupferhütte.

See also
List of rivers of Lower Saxony

Rivers of Lower Saxony
Rivers of the Harz
Rivers of Germany